Rizeh Mandan (also Romanized as Rīzeh Mandān; also known as Rīzmandan) is a village in Masal Rural District, in the Central District of Masal County, Gilan Province, Iran. At the 2006 census, its population was 26, in 7 families.

References 

Populated places in Masal County